BNS Umar Farooq was a  of the Bangladesh Navy. She was the first frigate to enter service with the Bangladesh Navy. The ship was named after the second Rashidun Caliph Umar.

History
She served the Royal Navy from 1958 to 1976. On 10 December 1976, she was transferred to the Bangladesh Navy.

Career
On 10 December 1976, BNS Umar Farooq was commissioned in the Bangladesh Navy. She was based at Chittagong, serving with the Commodore Commanding BN Flotilla (COMBAN). About 200 personnel served aboard Umar Farooq, with most living aboard her.

Umar Farooq paid a goodwill visit to India, Pakistan and Maldives in 1989. The ship participated in the International Fleet Review in South Korea in 1998.

On 26 February 2007, Umar Farooq paid a two-day goodwill visit to Kochi Port of India. In December 2010, the ship made a three-day visit to the Indian naval base at Visakhapatnam.

In 2014, Malaysia Airlines Flight 370, a 777-200ER, disappeared during flight. Due to the possibility of finding the wreckage in Bay of Bengal, Umar Farooq, along with the frigate , joined the search operation in this region.

She was decommissioned on 30 December 2015 after serving Bangladesh Navy for around 39 years, with a total service life of 57 years. After brief use as museum ship from December 2015, she was sold for demolition in Bangladesh in 2016. She was replaced by a Chinese-built Type 053H3 frigate  with the same name and pennant number.

Mission
Umar Farooq was deployed to support operations off the Bangladeshi coast, such as anti-piracy and anti-smuggling operations, as well as search and rescue deployments.

See also
 List of historic ships of the Bangladesh Navy

References

External links
 Umar Farooq at the Bangladeshi Navy's website

Salisbury-class frigates of the Bangladesh Navy
1955 ships
Ships of the Bangladesh Navy
Frigates of the Bangladesh Navy
Decommissioned ships of the Bangladesh Navy